The Farmington metropolitan area may refer to:

The Farmington, New Mexico metropolitan area, United States
The Farmington, Missouri micropolitan area, United States

See also
Farmington (disambiguation)